Aynalem Hailu (born 12 October 1986) is an Ethiopian footballer. He currently plays for Dashen Beer.

Career

Aynalem is central back defender. His abilities are pace, positional sense and an unswerving ability to stay calm under pressure.

International career

Aynalem is part of the Ethiopia national football team since 2011. He is on the list for 2013 African Nations Cup.

References

External links
 
 

1986 births
Living people
Sportspeople from Tigray Region
Ethiopia international footballers
2013 Africa Cup of Nations players
Ethiopian footballers
2014 African Nations Championship players
Ethiopia A' international footballers
Association football central defenders
Dashen Beer F.C. players
Defence Force F.C. players